Antonina  is a village in the administrative district of Gmina Dobre in Mińsk County, Masovian Voivodeship, east-central Poland.

References

Antonina